This is a list of fictional towns, villages, and cities from live-action television shows. This list should include only well-referenced, notable examples of fictional settlements that are integral to a work of fiction and substantively depicted therein. Fictionalized versions of actual towns (such as Raytown, Missouri in Mama's Family and Wellsville, New York in The Adventures of Pete & Pete) are not included.

For a list of fictional towns, villages and cities from animated television shows, see list of fictional towns in animation.

References

Fictional towns
Lists of fictional populated places